Luis Federico López Andúgar (born 8 May 2001) is a Spanish professional footballer who plays as a goalkeeper for Real Madrid Castilla.

Career statistics

Club

Honours
Real Madrid
FIFA Club World Cup: 2022

Real Madrid Juvenil A
UEFA Youth League: 2019–20

References

External links 

 Real Madrid profile

2001 births
Living people
Footballers from Murcia
Spanish footballers
Association football goalkeepers
Real Madrid Castilla footballers
Real Madrid CF players
Segunda División B players
Primera Federación players
Spain youth international footballers